Strikeforce: Feijao vs. Henderson, was a mixed martial arts event held by Strikeforce. It took place on March 5, 2011 at the Nationwide Arena in Columbus, Ohio, United States. The event was the first that the organization has hosted in the state of Ohio and coincided with the Arnold Sports Festival, which annually draws up to 150,000 sports fans.

Background
A rubber-match between Tim Kennedy and Jason Miller was expected for this event. However, Miller was pulled from the card for unknown reasons, and was replaced with Luke Rockhold. Only a few days after announcing the Rockhold/Kennedy match-up, it was reported that Rockhold had been removed and was replaced with Melvin Manhoef. The Kennedy/Rockhold match would later headline Strikeforce: Rockhold vs. Kennedy in July 2012, where Rockhold defended his then-Strikeforce Middleweight Championship by unanimous decision.

Jessica Eye was scheduled to make her Strikeforce debut at this event against former title contender Jan Finney, but the two could not agree upon a fight weight so the fight was called off.

Marloes Coenen was originally set to defend her title against number one contender Miesha Tate at this event, but on February 23, it was announced that Tate had to withdraw from the contest and her replacement would be Liz Carmouche. The Coenen/Tate bout was rescheduled for Strikeforce: Fedor vs. Henderson on July 30, where Tate won the title via fourth round submission.

Jorge Gurgel was originally set to fight promotional newcomer Tyler Combs at this event, but Combs injured himself five days before the event and had to withdraw from the bout. Billy Vaughan stepped in as his replacement.

Strikeforce Challengers commentator Pat Miletich filled in for Gus Johnson on the live broadcast of this event, as Johnson was calling an NCAA basketball game that night. Miletich would later permanently replace Johnson for Strikeforce's main events that fall.

This was the last Strikeforce event held during Silicon Valley Sports and Entertainment's ownership of the promotion. Zuffa, LLC announced their purchase of Strikeforce the following week.

The event drew average viewing TV audience of 412,000.

Results

Reported payout
The following is the reported payout to the fighters.

Dan Henderson: $250,000 (no win bonus) def. Rafael Cavalcante: $28,000
Marloes Coenen: $10,000 (no win bonus) def. Liz Carmouche: $5,000
Tim Kennedy: $50,000 (no win bonus) def. Melvin Manhoef: $10,000
Jorge Masvidal: $30,000 (including $15,000 win bonus) def. Billy Evangelista: $20,000
Roger Bowling: $7,000 (includes $3,500 win bonus) def. Josh Thornburg: $2,000
Jorge Gurgel: $8,000 (includes $4,000 win bonus) def. Billy Vaughan: $1,500
Jay Freeman: $3,000 (includes $1,500 win bonus) def. Jason Riley: $1,500
Brian Rogers: $3,000 (includes $1,500 win bonus) def. Ian Rammel: $1,500
Mitch Whitesel: $3,000 (includes $1,500 win bonus) def. Marc Cofer: $1,500
John Kuhner: $3,000 (includes $1,500 win bonus) def. J.P. Felty: $1,500

References

Feijao vs. Henderson
Events in Columbus, Ohio
2011 in mixed martial arts
Mixed martial arts in Ohio
Sports competitions in Columbus, Ohio
2011 in sports in Ohio